The General Motors Open was a golf tournament on the South African Tour from 1966 to 1975. The event was held at Wedgewood Golf Club in Port Elizabeth. South Africa. Gary Player won the event four times. It was also the site of Peter Oosterhuis' first professional victory.

Winners 
General Motors Open
1966 Harold Henning
1967 Cobie Legrange
1968 Cobie Legrange
1969 Graham Henning
1970 Peter Oosterhuis
1971 Gary Player

General Motors International Classic
1972 Harold Henning
1973 Hugh Baiocchi
1974 (Feb) Gary Player
1974 (Nov) Gary Player
1975 Gary Player

References 

Golf tournaments in South Africa